This article displays the squads of the teams that competed in 2016 FIBA World Olympic Qualifying Tournament for Women. Each team consists of 12 players.

Group A

Cuba

France

New Zealand

Group B

Argentina

Cameroon

Turkey

Group C

Belarus

Nigeria

South Korea

Group D

China

Spain

Venezuela

References

squads
Women's Olympic basketball squads